Peléan eruptions are a type of volcanic eruption. They can occur when viscous magma, typically of rhyolitic or andesitic type, is involved, and share some similarities with Vulcanian eruptions. The most important characteristic of a Peléan eruption is the presence of a glowing avalanche of hot volcanic ash, called a pyroclastic flow. Formation of lava domes is another characteristic. Short flows of ash or creation of pumice cones may be observed as well.

The initial phases of eruption are characterized by pyroclastic flows. The tephra deposits have lower volume and range than the corresponding Plinian and Vulcanian eruptions. The viscous magma then forms a steep-sided dome or volcanic spine in the volcano's vent. The dome may later collapse, resulting in flows of ash and hot blocks. The eruption cycle is usually completed in a few years, but in some cases may continue for decades, like in the case of Santiaguito.

The 1902 eruption of Mount Pelée (VEI-4) is the first described case of a Peléan eruption; the term is derived from the name of the volcano.

Other examples of Peléan eruptions include:
 the 1948–1951 eruption of Hibok-Hibok; (VEI-3)
 the 1951 eruption of Mount Lamington, which remains the most detailed observation of this kind; (VEI-4)
 the 1968 eruption of Mayon Volcano (VEI-3)
The 2021 eruption of La Soufrière (VEI-4)

See also

 Plinian eruption, related to the explosive eruptions of the Mount Vesuvius

References

 
Volcanic eruption types